Rosalie may refer to:

People
 Rosalie (given name)
 Rosalie Levasseur (1749-1826), French soprano billed as Mademoiselle Rosalie
 Rosalie Rendu or Sr. Rosalie (1786–1856), venerated by the Roman Catholic Church

Film and theater
Rosalie (musical), a 1928 musical by the Gershwins and others
Rosalie (film), a 1937 film version of the musical
Rosalie, an award-winning 1966 short film by Polish director Walerian Borowczyk

Places
 Rosalie, a locality of Paddington, Queensland, Australia
 Rosalie, Dominica, a town
 Rosalie, Nebraska, United States, a village

Songs
 "Rosalie" (song), a 2008 song by Swiss Rapper Bligg from 0816
 "Rosalie", a song by Bob Seger from Back in '72, also covered by Thin Lizzy about Rosalie Trombley
 "Rosalie", a 1978 song by Carlos
 "Rosalie", a 2012 song by Concrete Blonde

Other uses
 Tropical Storm Rosalie (disambiguation)
 Rosalie Mansion, a National Historic Landmark in Natchez, Mississippi, USA
 Citroën Rosalie, a light-weight racing car manufactured in the 1930s

See also
 Rosalia (disambiguation)
 Rosella (disambiguation)
 Plague Chapel of St. Rosalie, a one-nave chapel in Košice, eastern Slovakia

pl:Rozalia